Calmarza is a municipality located in the province of Zaragoza, Aragon, Spain. According to the 2010 census the municipality has a population of 77 inhabitants.

This town is located close to the limits of Guadalajara Province in the Mesa River valley, at the feet of the Sierra de Solorio range, Sistema Ibérico. The nearest town is Jaraba.

See also
Comunidad de Calatayud
List of municipalities in Zaragoza

References

External links

Calmarza - CAI Tourism of Aragon

Municipalities in the Province of Zaragoza